Nyssodrysternum lepidum is a species of beetle in the family Cerambycidae. It was described by Monne in 1992.

References

Nyssodrysternum
Beetles described in 1992